The following outline is provided as an overview of and topical guide to North Korea:

North Korea is a sovereign country located on the northern half of the Korean Peninsula in East Asia.  To the south, separated by the Korean Demilitarized Zone, lies South Korea, with which it formed one nation until division following World War II.  At its northern Amnok River border are China and, separated by the Tumen River in the extreme north-east, Russia.  The capital of North Korea is the city of Pyongyang.

North Korea is widely considered to be a Stalinist dictatorship. The country's government styles itself as following the Juche ideology of self-reliance, developed by Kim Il-sung, the country's former leader. The current leader is Kim Jong-un, the late president Kim Il-sung's grandson and son of deceased leader Kim Jong-il. Relations are strongest with other officially socialist states: Vietnam, Laos, and China, as well as with Russia, Cambodia, and Myanmar. Following a major famine in the early 1990s, due partly to the collapse of the Soviet Union (previously a major economic partner), leader Kim Jong-il instigated the "Military-First" policy in 1995, increasing economic concentration and support for the military.

North Korea's culture is officially promoted and heavily controlled by the government. The Arirang Festivals or "Mass Games" are government-organized events glorifying the regime, involving over 100,000 performers.

General reference 

 Pronunciation: 
 Common English country name:  North Korea
 Official English country name:  The Democratic People's Republic of Korea
 Common endonym(s): 조선 (Chosŏn), 북조선 (Bukchosŏn)
 Official endonym(s): 조선민주주의인민공화국 (Chosŏn Minjujuŭi Inmin Konghwaguk)
 Adjectival(s): North Korean
 Demonym(s): Korean, North Korean
 Etymology: Name of North Korea
 ISO country codes:  KP, PRK, 408
 ISO region codes:  See ISO 3166-2:KP
 Internet country code top-level domain:  .kp
 Time in North Korea
 North Korean calendar
 International rankings of North Korea

Geography of North Korea 

Geography of North Korea
 North Korea is: a country
 Location:
 Northern Hemisphere and Eastern Hemisphere
 Eurasia
 Asia
 East Asia
 Korean Peninsula
 Time zone:  Pyongyang Time (UTC+09:00)
 Extreme points of North Korea
 High:  Paektu-san 
 Low:  Sea of Japan and Yellow Sea 0 m
 Land boundaries:  
 
 
 
 Coastline:  
 Population of North Korea: 23,790,000  - 47th most populous country

 Area of North Korea: 
 Atlas of North Korea

Environment of North Korea 

 Climate of North Korea
 Environment of North Korea
 Climate change in North Korea
 Wildlife of North Korea
 Flora of North Korea
 Fauna of North Korea
 Birds of North Korea
 Mammals of North Korea

Natural geographic features of North Korea 

 Natural monuments of North Korea
 Islands of North Korea
 Lakes of North Korea
 Mountains of North Korea
 Volcanoes in North Korea
 Rivers of North Korea
 Valleys of North Korea
 List of World Heritage Sites in North Korea

Regions of North Korea 

Regions of North Korea
 China–North Korea border
 North Korea–Russia border

Ecoregions of North Korea

Administrative divisions of North Korea 

Administrative divisions of North Korea
 First-level divisions
 Second-level divisions
 Third-level divisions

Provinces of North Korea 

Provinces
Special Administrative Regions
Directly-governed cities

Provinces of North Korea

 Chagang Province (Chagang-do; 자강도; 慈江道)
 North Hamgyŏng Province (Hamgyŏng-pukto; 함경 북도; 咸鏡北道)
 South Hamgyŏng Province (Hamgyŏng-namdo; 함경 남도; 咸鏡南道)
 North Hwanghae Province (Hwanghae-pukto; 황해 북도; 黃海北道)
 South Hwanghae Province (Hwanghae-namdo; 황해 남도; 黃海南道)
 Kangwŏn Province (Kangwŏndo; 강원도; 江原道)
 North P'yŏngan Province (P'yŏngan-pukto; 평안 북도; 平安北道)

 South P'yŏngan Province (P'yŏngan-namdo; 평안 남도; 平安南道)
 Ryanggang Province (Ryanggang-do; 량강도; 兩江道)1
Note:Sometimes also spelled as "Yanggang" in English.
 Kaesŏng Industrial Region (Kaesŏng Kongŏp Chigu; 개성 공업 지구; 開城工業地區)
 Mount Kumgang Tourist Region (Kŭmgangsan Kwan'gwang Chigu; 금강산 관광 지구; 金剛山觀光地區)
 Sinŭiju Special Administrative Region (Sinŭiju T'ŭkpyŏl Haengjŏnggu; 신의주 특별 행정구; 新義州特別行政區)
 P'yŏngyang (P'yŏngyang Chikhalsi; 평양 직할시; 平壤直轄市)
 Rasŏn (Rajin-Sŏnbong)(Rasŏn (Rajin-Sŏnbong) Chikhalsi; 라선 (라진-선봉) 직할시; 羅先 (羅津-先鋒) 直轄市)

Second-level administrative districts of North Korea, by province

Pyongyang Directly Governed City 

Pyongyang Directly Governed City
 18 wards (guyok): 
 Chung-guyok
 Pyongchon-guyok
 Potonggang-guyok
 Moranbong-guyok
 Sosong-guyok
 Songyo-guyok
 Tongdaewon-guyok
 Taedonggang-guyok
 Sadong-guyok
 Taesong-guyok
 Mangyongdae-guyok
 Hyongjesan-guyok
 Ryongsong-guyok
 Samsok-guyok
 Ryokpo-guyok
 Rangnang-guyok
 Sunan-guyok
 Unjong-guyok
 1 county (kun): Kangdong

Rason Special City 

Rason Special City
 1 ward (guyok): Rajin
 1 county (kun): Sonbong

Chagang Province 

Chagang Province
 3 cities (si): 
 Kanggye
 Huichon
 Manpo
 15 counties (kun): 
 Changgang County
 Chasong County
 Chonchon County
 Chosan County
 Chunggang County
 Hwapyong County
 Kopung County
 Rangrim County
 Ryongrim County
 Sijung County
 Songgan County
 Songwon County
 Tongsin County
 Usi County
 Wiwon County

North Hamgyŏng Province 

North Hamgyong Province
 3 cities (si): 
 Chongjin
 Hoeryong
 Kimchaek
 12 counties (kun): 
 Myonggan County
 Hwadae County
 Kilju County
 Kyongsong County
 Musan County
 Myongchon County
 Onsong County
 Orang County
 Puryong County
 Kyongwon County
 Kyonghung County
 Yonsa County

South Hamgyŏng Province 

South Hamgyong Province
 4 cities (si): 
 Hamhung
 Hungnam
 Sinpo
 Tanchon
 1 district (ku): Sudong
 1 area (chigu): Kumho (North Korea)
 15 counties (kun): 
 Changjin County
 Chongpyong County
 Hamju County
 Hochon County
 Hongwon County
 Kowon County
 Kumya County
 Pujon County
 Pukchong County
 Ragwon County
 Riwon County
 Sinhung County
 Toksong County
 Yonggwang County
 Yodok County

North Hwanghae Province 

North Hwanghae Province
 3 cities (si): 
 Sariwon
 Kaesong (City with special status / Kaesong Industrial Region)
 Songrim
 19 counties (kun): Changpung County
 Chunghwa County
 Hwangju County
 Kaepung County
 Kangnam County
 Koksan County
 Kumchon County
 Pongsan County
 Pyongsan County
 Rinsan County
 Sangwon County
 Singye County
 Sinpyong County
 Sohung County
 Suan County
 Tosan County
 Unpa County
 Yonsan County
 Yontan County

South Hwanghae Province 

South Hwanghae Province
 1 city (si): Haeju
 19 counties (kun): 
 Anak County
 Chaeryong County
 Changyon County
 Chongdan County
 Kangryong County
 Kwail County
 Ongjin County, South Hwanghae
 Paechon County
 Pongchon County
 Pyoksong County
 Ryongyon County
 Samchon County
 Sinchon County
 Sinwon County
 Songhwa County
 Taetan County
 Ullyul County
 Unchon County
 Yonan County

Kangwon Province 

Kangwon Province (North Korea)
 2 cities (si): 
 Munchon
 Wonsan
 1 special administrative region: Mount Kumgang Tourist Region
 15 counties (kun): 
 Anbyon County
 Changdo County
 Chorwon County
 Chonnae County
 Hoeyang County
 Ichon County
 Kimhwa County
 Kosan County
 Kosong County
 Kumgang County
 Pangyo County
 Poptong County
 Pyonggang County
 Sepo County
 Tongchon County

North P'yŏngan Province 

North Pyongan Province
 3 cities (si): 
 Sinuiju
 Chongju
 Kusong
 22 counties (kun): 
 Changsong County
 Cholsan County
 Chonma County
 Hyangsan County
 Kujang County
 Kwaksan County
 Nyongbyon County
 Pakchon County
 Pihyon County
 Pyoktong County
 Ryongchon County
 Sakchu County
 Sindo County
 Sonchon County
 Taechon County
 Taegwan County
 Tongchang County
 Tongrim County
 Uiju County
 Unjon County
 Unsan County
 Yomju County

South P'yŏngan Province 

South Pyongan Province
 6 cities (si): 
 Pyongsong
 Anju, South Pyongan
 Kaechon
 Nampo (City with special status)
 Sunchon
 Tokchon
 1 district (ku): Chongnam
 2 districts (chigu): 
 Tukchang
 Ungok
 16 counties (kun): 
 Chungsan County
 Hoechang County
 Maengsan County
 Mundok County
 Nyongwon County
 Pukchang County
 Pyongwon County
 Sinyang County
 Songchon County
 Sukchon County
 Taedong County
 Taehung County
 Unsan County, South Pyongan
 Yangdok County

Ryanggang Province 

Ryanggang Province
 1 city (si): Hyesan
 11 counties (kun): 
 Kapsan County
 Kimjongsuk County
 Kimhyonggwon County
 Kimhyongjik County
 Paegam County
 Pochon County
 Pungso County
 Samjiyon County
 Samsu County
 Taehongdan County
 Unhung County

Municipalities of North Korea 

Municipalities of North Korea
 Capital of North Korea: Pyongyang
 Cities of North Korea
 Special cities of North Korea

Demography of North Korea 

Demographics of North Korea
 1993 North Korea Census
 2008 North Korea Census

Government and politics of North Korea 

Politics of North Korea
 Form of government:Unitary one-party socialist republic under a totalitarian hereditary dictatorship
 Capital of North Korea: Pyongyang
 North Korean abductions of Japanese citizens
 North Korean abductions of South Koreans
 Corruption in North Korea
 North Korean defectors
 North Korean defectors in Thailand
 List of North Korean defectors in South Korea
 Elections in North Korea
 1948 North Korean parliamentary election
 1957 North Korean parliamentary election
 1962 North Korean parliamentary election
 1967 North Korean parliamentary election
 1972 North Korean parliamentary election
 1977 North Korean parliamentary election
 1982 North Korean parliamentary election
 1986 North Korean parliamentary election
 1990 North Korean parliamentary election
 1998 North Korean parliamentary election
 2003 North Korean parliamentary election
 2009 North Korean parliamentary election
 2014 North Korean parliamentary election
 North Korea's illicit activities
 Mass surveillance in North Korea
 Political parties in North Korea
 Workers' Party of North Korea
 1st Central Committee of the Workers' Party of North Korea
 1st Central Inspection Commission of the Workers' Party of North Korea
 1st Congress of the Workers' Party of North Korea
 2nd Congress of the Workers' Party of North Korea
 Propaganda in North Korea

Branches of the government of North Korea 

Government of North Korea

Executive branch of the government of North Korea 
 Head of state: Chairman of the State Affairs Commission
 Head of government: Premier of North Korea
 Residences of North Korean leaders
 North Korean leaders' trains
 Cabinet of North Korea
 Minister of Foreign Affairs (North Korea)
 Departments of the government of North Korea
 Ministry of Post and Telecommunications (North Korea)

Legislative branch of the government of North Korea 

 Parliament of North Korea (unicameral)

Judicial branch of the government of North Korea 

 Judiciary of North Korea

Foreign relations of North Korea 

Foreign relations of North Korea
 Diplomatic missions in North Korea
 Diplomatic missions of North Korea
 Embassy of North Korea in Moscow
 Embassy of North Korea, London
 North Korea–South Korea relations
 Australia–North Korea relations
 Botswana–North Korea relations
 Brazil–North Korea relations
 Burkina Faso–North Korea relations
 Burundi–North Korea relations
 Cambodia–North Korea relations
 Canada–North Korea relations
 Central African Republic–North Korea relations
 China–North Korea relations
 Comoros–North Korea relations
 Denmark–North Korea relations
 Equatorial Guinea–North Korea relations
 Foreign relations of North Korea
 France–North Korea relations
 Germany–North Korea relations
 Grenada–North Korea relations
 Guinea-Bissau–North Korea relations
 Hong Kong–North Korea relations
 Hungary–North Korea relations
 Iceland–North Korea relations
 India–North Korea relations
 Indonesia–North Korea relations
 Iran–North Korea relations
 Israel–North Korea relations
 Italy–North Korea relations
 Japan–North Korea relations
 Kenya–North Korea relations
 Malaysia–North Korea relations
 Mauritania–North Korea relations
 Mongolia–North Korea relations
 Namibia–North Korea relations
 New Zealand–North Korea relations
 North Korea–Norway relations
 North Korea–Pakistan relations
 North Korea–Palestine relations
 North Korea–Philippines relations
 North Korea–Poland relations
 North Korea–Russia relations
 North Korea–Rwanda relations
 North Korea–Serbia relations
 North Korea–Seychelles relations
 North Korea–Singapore relations
 North Korea–Somalia relations
 North Korea–Tanzania relations
 North Korea–Togo relations
 North Korea–United Kingdom relations
 North Korea–United States relations
 CIA activities in North Korea
 North Korea–Vietnam relations
 The Gambia–North Korea relations

International organization membership 

The Democratic People's Republic of Korea is a member of:

Association of Southeast Asian Nations Regional Forum (ARF)
Food and Agriculture Organization (FAO)
Group of 77 (G77)
International Civil Aviation Organization (ICAO)
International Federation of Red Cross and Red Crescent Societies (IFRCS)
International Fund for Agricultural Development (IFAD)
International Hydrographic Organization (IHO)
International Maritime Organization (IMO)
International Olympic Committee (IOC)
International Organization for Standardization (ISO)
International Red Cross and Red Crescent Movement (ICRM)
International Telecommunication Union (ITU)
International Telecommunications Satellite Organization (ITSO)

Inter-Parliamentary Union (IPU)
Nonaligned Movement (NAM)
United Nations (UN)
United Nations Conference on Trade and Development (UNCTAD)
United Nations Educational, Scientific, and Cultural Organization (UNESCO)
United Nations Industrial Development Organization (UNIDO)
Universal Postal Union (UPU)
World Federation of Trade Unions (WFTU)
World Health Organization (WHO)
World Intellectual Property Organization (WIPO)
World Meteorological Organization (WMO)
World Tourism Organization (UNWTO)

North Korea is one of only seven U.N. members which is not a member of the Organisation for the Prohibition of Chemical Weapons.

Law and order in North Korea 

Law of North Korea
 Cannabis in North Korea
 Capital punishment in North Korea
 Citizenship in North Korea
 Constitution of North Korea
 Copyright law of North Korea
 Crime in North Korea
 Human rights in North Korea
 Censorship in North Korea
 Human experimentation in North Korea
 Human trafficking in North Korea
 LGBT rights in North Korea
 Freedom of religion in North Korea
 Mass surveillance in North Korea
 Taxation in North Korea
 Law enforcement in North Korea
 Prisons in North Korea
 Visa policy of North Korea
 Visa requirements for North Korean citizens

Military of North Korea 

Military of North Korea
 Command
 Commander-in-chief
 Central Military Commission
 Ministry of Defence of North Korea
 Forces
 Army of North Korea
 105th Armored Division (North Korea)
 1st Division (North Korea)
 3rd Division (North Korea)
 6th Division (North Korea)
 I Corps (North Korea)
 II Corps (North Korea)
 III Corps (North Korea)
 IV Corps (North Korea)
 V Corps (North Korea)
 XII Corps (North Korea)
 Tanks of North Korea
 Navy of North Korea
 Air Force of North Korea
 Military history of North Korea
 Military ranks of North Korea

Local government in North Korea 

Local government in North Korea

 1946 North Korean local elections
 1947 North Korean local elections
 1949 North Korean local elections
 1956 North Korean local elections
 1959 North Korean local elections
 1963 North Korean local elections
 1967 North Korean local elections
 1972 North Korean local elections
 1975 North Korean local elections
 1977 North Korean local elections
 1979 North Korean local elections
 1981 North Korean local elections
 1983 North Korean local elections
 1985 North Korean local elections
 1987 North Korean local elections
 1989 North Korean local elections
 1991 North Korean local elections
 1993 North Korean local elections
 1999 North Korean local elections
 2003 North Korean local elections
 2007 North Korean local elections
 2011 North Korean local elections
 2015 North Korean local elections

History of North Korea 

History of North Korea

 Military history of North Korea

History of North Korea, by period 

 History of Korea
 Korea under Japanese rule – Japan endeavored to integrate Korea into its empire, exploiting its resources and its people
 Surrender of Japan – marked the end of World War II, and the end of Japanese occupation of Korea
 Division of Korea – at the end of World War II, the Soviets and Americans occupied Korea, dividing the region at the 38th parallel. Two governments emerged, one in the North, and another in the South, both claiming sovereignty over the whole of Korea. This led to the...
 Kim dynasty
 North Korean cult of personality
 Kim Il-sung (ruled from 1948 to 1994)
 Korean conflict – conflict that began with the division of Korea and continues to the present day
 Korean War – war that began when North Korea invaded South Korea.
 Korean Armistice Agreement – document that ended the Korean War. However, no peace treaty followed, so North and South Korea are technically still at war.
 Korean Demilitarized Zone (DMZ) – strip of land running across the Korean Peninsula. It was established at the end of the Korean War to serve as a buffer zone between North and South Korea.
 Korean War POWs detained in North Korea
 Korean DMZ Conflict (1966–69)
 Death and state funeral of Kim Il-sung
 Kim Jong-il (ruled from 1994 to 2011)
 Kim Jong-un (ruled from 2011 to present)
 2018–19 Korean peace process
 Peace Treaty on Korean Peninsula

History of North Korea, by year 

List of years in North Korea
1948
1949
1950
1951
1952
1953
1954
1955
1956
1957
1958
1959
1960
1961
1962
1963
1964
1965
1966
1967
1968
1969
1970
1971
1972
1973
1974
1975
1976
1977
1978
1979
1980
1981
1982
1983
1984
1985
1986
1987
1988
1989
1990
1991
1992
1993
1994
1995
1996
1997
1998
1999
2000
2001
2002
2003
2004
2005
2006
2007
2008
2009
2010
2011
2012
2013
2014
2015
2016

History of Korea, by region

History of Korea, by subject 

 North Korea flooding
 2006 North Korean floods
 2007 North Korean floods
 2012 North Korean floods
 Massacres in North Korea
 Military history of North Korea
 Historical military units
 2nd Division (North Korea)
 4th Division (North Korea)
 5th Division (North Korea)
 8th Division (North Korea)
 9th Division (North Korea)
 10th Division (North Korea)
 12th Division (North Korea)
 13th Division (North Korea)
 15th Division (North Korea)
 18th Division (North Korea)
 19th Division (North Korea)
 27th Division (North Korea)
 43rd Division (North Korea)
 25th Infantry Brigade (North Korea)
 766th Independent Infantry Regiment (North Korea)
 78th Independent Infantry Regiment (North Korea)
 North Korea and weapons of mass destruction
 Timeline of the North Korean nuclear program
 Missile tests
 1993
 2006
 2009
 more
 2013
 2014
 2016
 Nuclear tests
 2006 (reactions)
 2009 (reactions)
 2013 (reactions)
 January 2016 (reactions)
 Wars involving North Korea

Culture of North Korea 

Culture of North Korea
 Architecture of North Korea
 Cuisine of North Korea
 List of North Korean dishes
 Cultural assets of North Korea
 Languages of North Korea
 North Korean standard language
 North Korean Russian
 Media in North Korea
 National symbols of North Korea
 Emblem of North Korea
 Flag of North Korea
 National anthem of North Korea
 Prostitution in North Korea
 Public holidays in North Korea
 Religion in North Korea
 Buddhism in North Korea
 Christianity in North Korea
 Roman Catholicism in North Korea
 Hinduism in North Korea
 Irreligion in North Korea
 Islam in North Korea
 List of museums in North Korea
 List of World Heritage Sites in North Korea

Art in North Korea 

 Art in North Korea
 Cinema of North Korea
 Literature of North Korea
 Music of North Korea
 * Smoking in North Korea
 North Korean films
 North Korean literature
 List of North Korean actors
 List of North Korean films
 List of North Korean flags
 List of North Korean football champions
 List of North Korean musicians
 List of North Korean operas
 List of North Korean records in athletics
 List of North Korean television series
 Television in North Korea
 Theatre in North Korea
 List of theatres in North Korea

People of North Korea 

People of North Korea
 Koreans
 North Korean diaspora
 North Koreans in Russia
 North Koreans in South Korea
 Ethnic groups in North Korea
 Americans in North Korea
 Chinese North Korean
 French North Korean
 German North Korean
 Japanese North Korean
 Japanese people in North Korea
 Women in North Korea

Sports in North Korea 

Sport in North Korea
 Football in North Korea
 North Korea at the FIFA World Cup
 North Korea national football team
 North Korea national under-17 football team
 North Korea national under-20 football team
 North Korea national under-23 football team
 North Korea women's national football team
 North Korea women's national under-17 football team
 North Korea women's national under-20 football team
 2010 North Korea national football team results
 2011 North Korea national football team results
 2012 North Korea national football team results
 2009 North Korea national football team results
 List of football clubs in North Korea
 List of football stadiums in North Korea
 North Korea–South Korea football rivalry
 Ice hockey in North Korea
 North Korea men's national ice hockey team
 North Korea men's national junior ice hockey team
 North Korea men's national under-18 ice hockey team
 North Korea women's national ice hockey team
 North Korea at the Asian Games
 North Korea at the 1974 Asian Games
 North Korea at the 1982 Asian Games
 North Korea at the 1998 Asian Games
 North Korea at the 2002 Asian Games
 North Korea at the 2006 Asian Games
 North Korea at the 2007 Asian Winter Games
 North Korea at the 2009 Asian Indoor Games
 North Korea at the 2010 Asian Games
 North Korea at the 2011 Asian Winter Games
 North Korea at the 2014 Asian Games
 North Korea at the Olympics
 North Korea at the 1964 Winter Olympics
 North Korea at the 1972 Summer Olympics
 North Korea at the 1972 Winter Olympics
 North Korea at the 1976 Summer Olympics
 North Korea at the 1980 Summer Olympics
 North Korea at the 1984 Winter Olympics
 North Korea at the 1988 Winter Olympics
 North Korea at the 1992 Summer Olympics
 North Korea at the 1992 Winter Olympics
 North Korea at the 1996 Summer Olympics
 North Korea at the 1998 Winter Olympics
 North Korea at the 2000 Summer Olympics
 North Korea at the 2004 Summer Olympics
 North Korea at the 2006 Winter Olympics
 North Korea at the 2008 Summer Olympics
 North Korea at the 2010 Winter Olympics
 North Korea at the 2012 Summer Olympics
 North Korea at the 2016 Summer Olympics
 North Korea at the Paralympics
 North Korea at the 2012 Summer Paralympics
 North Korea at the 2016 Summer Paralympics
 North Korea at the 2009 East Asian Games
 North Korea at the 2009 World Championships in Athletics
 North Korea at the 2010 Summer Youth Olympics
 North Korea at the 2011 World Aquatics Championships
 North Korea at the 2013 World Aquatics Championships
 North Korea at the 2015 World Aquatics Championships
 North Korea at the 2013 World Championships in Athletics
 North Korea at the 2014 Summer Youth Olympics
 North Korea at the 2015 World Championships in Athletics
 Volleyball in North Korea
 North Korea women's national volleyball team
 North Korea national amateur boxing athletes
 North Korea national baseball team
 North Korea national basketball team
 North Korea national under-17 basketball team
 North Korea women's national basketball team
 North Korea women's national handball team
 North Korea women's national softball team
 North Korea women's national under-19 basketball team
 North Korean records in Olympic weightlifting
 North Korean Championship (ice hockey)
 North Korean Figure Skating Championships

Economy and infrastructure of North Korea 

Economy of North Korea
 Economic rank, by nominal GDP (2007): 155th (one hundred and fifty fifth)
 Agriculture in North Korea
 Potato production in North Korea
 Banking in North Korea
 National Bank of North Korea
 List of banks in North Korea
 Companies of North Korea
Currency of North Korea: Won
ISO 4217: KPW
 Defense industry of North Korea
 Energy in North Korea
 Nuclear power in North Korea
 Health care in North Korea
 Mining in North Korea
 Poverty in North Korea
 Shadow economy of North Korea
 Taxation in North Korea
 Tourism in North Korea
List of amusement parks in North Korea

Communications in North Korea 

Communications in North Korea
 North Korean postal service
 Postage stamps and postal history of North Korea
 Telecommunications in North Korea
 Internet in North Korea
 Telephone numbers in North Korea
 Media of North Korea
 List of magazines in North Korea
 List of newspapers in North Korea
 List of radio stations in North Korea

Transport in North Korea 

Transport in North Korea
 List of highway airstrips in North Korea
 Airports in North Korea
 Rail transport in North Korea
 List of railway stations in North Korea
 Railway lines in North Korea
 Vehicular transport in North Korea
 Automotive industry in North Korea
 Bridges in North Korea
 Vehicle registration plates of North Korea
 Roads in North Korea
 Trams and trolleybuses in North Korea

Education in North Korea 

Education in North Korea
 List of universities in North Korea

Health in North Korea 

Health in North Korea
 Disability in North Korea
 HIV/AIDS in North Korea

Bibliographies 
Bibliography of North Korea

See also 

North Korea
List of international rankings
Member state of the United Nations
Outline of Asia
Outline of geography
Outline of South Korea

 2008 New York Philharmonic visit to North Korea
 2009 imprisonment of American journalists by North Korea
 Active North Korean ships
 Ambassadors from China to North Korea
 Ambassadors of Russia to North Korea
 Ambassadors of the United Kingdom to North Korea
 Australian Ambassadors to North Korea
 Border incidents involving North Korea
 Diplomatic missions of North Korea
 Flag bearers for North Korea at the Olympics
 Foreign nationals detained in North Korea
 Heads of state of North Korea
 Hotels in North Korea
 Leaders of North Korea
 Media coverage of North Korea
 North Korean merchant ships
 North Korean occupation of South Korea, June to September, 1950
 North Korean support for Iran during the Iran–Iraq war
 North Korean websites banned in South Korea
 Prime Ministers of North Korea
 United Nations Security Council resolutions concerning North Korea
 United States Special Representative for North Korea Policy
 International Coalition to Stop Crimes Against Humanity in North Korea
 Iran North Korea Syria Nonproliferation Act
 Japan–North Korea Pyongyang Declaration
 National Treasure (North Korea)
 North Hamgyeong Province (Republic of Korea)
 North Pyeongan Province (Republic of Korea)
 North–South differences in the Korean language
 Order of Friendship (North Korea)
 Orders and medals of North Korea
 U.S. Committee for Human Rights in North Korea
 North Korea Sanctions Enforcement Act of 2013
 North Korean Human Rights Act of 2004
 North Korean studies

References

External links 

 Official Website of the DPR Korea
 Official Website of the DPR Korea in Switzerland
 North Korea Uncovered , (North Korea Google Earth) Comprehensive mapping on Google Earth of the DPRK's political and economic infrastructure, including railways, hotels, factories, military facilities, tourist destinations, cultural facilities, ports, communications, and electricity grid.
 KCNA  - Korean Central News Agency, the official news agency of the DPRK
 Naenara - ("My country") DPRK's Official Web Portal run by Korea Computer Company
 

North Korea